The Puez-Geisler Nature Park is a nature reserve in the Dolomites in South Tyrol, Italy.

References 
Civic network of South Tyrol

External links 

 Photo 360°: Geisler position: Seceda, Geisler position: Brogles,  Geisler position: Gschnagenhardt

Puez-Geisler